Backstreet Boys is the first compilation album released by the vocal-pop group Backstreet Boys in the United States. The compilation is a collection of tracks from Backstreet Boys' first and second international albums, Backstreet Boys (1996) and Backstreet's Back (1997), respectively. Since the album and Backstreet's Back were released at the same time, both albums share the same cover, only with different titles.

The compilation became one of their most successful albums and received acclaim from music critics. It peaked at number four on the Billboard 200 albums chart and has been certified 14× platinum (diamond) by the RIAA for sales to retailers, having sold over 14 million copies to date in the United States. This was also reported as the second highest seller in the past 14 years for Music Club sales back in 2003, selling 1.72 million units.

Background
There were two editions of this album available. The original pressing contained 11 songs - six from the 1996 Backstreet Boys album and five from Backstreet's Back. This version did not include "Everybody (Backstreet's Back)". Presumably, this may have been due to the title of the song, which correlates with the title of the international album, Backstreet's Back. The title would not necessarily make sense in the context of this album being their American debut. The decision to make it a single in the US contributed to a re-release of the album in 1998, which contained 12 tracks, this time including an extended version of the song. 

There are also several differences between the songs from the international debut album and both 1997 and 1998 pressings of the Backstreet Boys compilation. The 1998 pressing contains the single mixes of "Quit Playing Games" and "As Long as You Love Me". For the single version of "Quit Playing Games", the second verse was re-recorded to feature Nick Carter, replacing Brian Littrell's verse from the original version. The single version of "As Long as You Love Me" uses different instrumentation, arrangement and mixing and was released on the 1998 pressing of the album and on The Hits – Chapter One (2001). The Backstreet's Back album contains the original version of "Everybody (Backstreet's Back)", while the 1998 pressings of the Backstreet Boys compilation use an extended version.

The original pressing of the album had a maroon spine and blue background on the back inlay. The second pressing of the album had a teal spine and a straw-colored background on the back inlay. Both versions of the album contained the same Enhanced Section, containing videos and other multimedia files.

Marketing
To promote the album the group appeared on Live with Regis and Kathie Lee, Sabrina the Teenage Witch, Saturday Night Live, MTV, The Ricki Lake Show, The Rosie O'Donnell Show, Soul Train and All That.

Commercial performance
Backstreet Boys debuted at number 29 on the US Billboard 200 the week of August 30, 1997 with 40,000 copies sold while solicitation for the album stood at 602,000 units following the group's success of their song, "Quit Playing Games (With My Heart)". After five months, on January 31, 1998, it reached and peaked at number four on the chart, when this happened the album had already sold two million copies in the United States. According to Nielsen SoundScan, it was the fifty-second best selling record of 1997 in the United States with 1,300,000 copies sold and the third best selling album of 1998 with 5,700,000 copies sold. The album was certified fourteen times platinum by the RIAA on April 5, 2001 denoting shipments of fourteen millions.

As of March 2015, the album had sold 11,687,000 copies in the US according to Nielsen Music. It had sold additional 1.72 million units at the BMG Music Club as of February 2003.

Track listing

Charts

Weekly charts

Year-end charts

Decade-end charts

All-time charts

Certifications

See also
 List of best-selling albums
 List of best-selling albums in the United States

References

Notes

Backstreet Boys albums
Albums produced by Max Martin
1997 compilation albums
Jive Records compilation albums